The butterfly forest gecko (Cyrtodactylus papilionoides)  
is a species of gecko endemic to Thailand.

References

External links
 Flickr photo by Dave
 Flickr photo by Dave

Cyrtodactylus
Geckos of Thailand
Endemic fauna of Thailand
Reptiles described in 1991